John Bracken  (June 22, 1883 – March 18, 1969) was a Canadian agronomist and politician who was the 11th and longest-serving premier of Manitoba (1922–1943) and later the leader of the Progressive Conservative Party of Canada (1942–1948).

Bracken was born in Ontario, and was a professor of animal husbandry at the University of Saskatchewan before moving to Manitoba in 1920. A political outsider, he was named leader of the Progressive Party of Manitoba following its upset victory in the 1922 Manitoba general election. During his tenure as premier of Manitoba, he implemented independent, non-partisan policies dominated by rural interests and opposed organized labour. He oversaw the creation of a universal pension, the provincial income tax, and reductions in spending on health, education and welfare as well as the replacement of the first past the post voting system with alternative voting. He pursued development by promoting staple industries such as mining, timber and fishing. After leading the Progressive Party to a second consecutive majority in the 1927 election, he merged the Progressive Party with the Liberal Party of Manitoba to form the Liberal-Progressive Party in 1932. He led the Liberal-Progressive Party to consecutive victories in elections in 1932, 1936 and 1941, winning majority governments in all but the 1936 election.

In 1942, he agreed to run for the leadership of the federal Conservative Party of Canada at the condition that the party be renamed the Progressive Conservative Party of Canada. After being elected leader of the newly renamed party, he resigned as premier of Manitoba and led the PCs to a second-place finish during the 1945 Canadian federal election against the incumbent Liberal Party government led by Prime Minister William Lyon Mackenzie King. He resigned as leader of the party in 1948 and was succeeded by George A. Drew. After being defeated while running for reelection to the House of Commons in the 1949 federal election, he retired from politics and died in 1969.

Early life

Bracken was born in Ellisville, Ontario, the son of Ephriam Michael Bracken and Alberta Gilbert, and was educated at Brockville Collegiate, the Ontario Agricultural College and at the University of Illinois. In 1909, he married Alice Wylie Bruce. He was professor of animal husbandry at the University of Saskatchewan from 1910 to 1920, when he became president of the Manitoba Agricultural College.

Premier of Manitoba

In 1922, the United Farmers of Manitoba unexpectedly won the provincial election. The UFM's expectations had been so low going into the election that they had not even named a leader and ran candidates in only two thirds of the seats.

With their upset victory, the UFM faced the task of naming a leader who would become the province's new premier. After federal MPs Thomas Crerar and Robert Hoey turned down the UFM's offer, they turned to Bracken, who accepted, and he was sworn in as premier on August 8. He entered the legislature a few months later after winning a deferred election in the northern riding of The Pas. (A similar situation had occurred with Ernest C. Drury when the United Farmers of Ontario won the 1919 election in that province.)

Bracken was a political outsider and gave the UFM the professional grounding it needed. The United Farmers generally rejected the partisanship of the Liberal and Conservative parties and favoured government policies based on independence and principles of business management. The UFM governed as the Progressive Party of Manitoba, and Bracken served as Manitoba's premier for over 20 years.

Bracken's government was, in most respects, conservative and cautious. It was dominated by rural interests, who controlled the Legislative Assembly of Manitoba. The first past the post voting system used in rural single-member districts was replaced by alternative voting during his government's reign. Labour did not fare well under Bracken's leadership; he had little sympathy for the leaders of the Winnipeg General Strike and once fired a number of government workers to show his independence from organized labour.

In the 1920s, Bracken oversaw an increase in taxation and created the provincial income tax. He lowered expenditures in health, education, and welfare but introduced a pension for all citizens over seventy years old in 1928. Under his administration, the province created a censorship board that regulated motion pictures. In 1923, Manitoba voted to end the prohibition of alcohol. The restrictive Liquor Control Act, passed that same year, sold liquor at provincially controlled outlets, resulting in the generation of a substantial new income.

Bracken worked to promote staple industries such as mining, timber cutting, and fishing, while also promoting hydroelectric power. He successfully had the Hudson Bay Railway create a branch line to Flin Flon, resulting in the opening of a copper and zinc mine there in 1926. Bracken was a vocal proponent of the provincial control of natural resources and influenced Mackenzie King's 1930 decision to give Manitoba, Alberta, and Saskatchewan control over crown lands.

In keeping with the UFM's "anti-party" philosophy, Bracken favoured non-partisan government. In 1931, his Progressives formed an alliance with the Manitoba Liberal Party, and the two parties eventually merged into one. In 1940, Bracken formed a wartime coalition government that included the Conservative, Co-operative Commonwealth Federation (CCF) and Social Credit parties.

When Bracken left provincial politics in 1943, there were only 5 opposition Members of the Legislative Assembly (MLAs) in a 57-member parliament. His coalition remained intact until 1950 although the CCF left in 1943.

Federal politics

Despite having co-operated with the Liberals at the provincial level, Bracken was asked by a number of senior federal Conservatives (including Arthur Meighen) to take over the leadership of the weak national Conservative Party in 1942. He agreed to seek the party's leadership on the condition that it change its name to the Progressive Conservative Party. He was elected leader at the party's 1942 leadership convention. Bracken stepped down as Manitoba premier shortly thereafter, and was succeeded by Stuart S. Garson.

Bracken did not seek a seat in the House of Commons until the 1945 Canadian election. While Bracken won the rural seat of Neepawa, the Tories were defeated nationally. The Tories picked up 29 seats, but were still well behind the governing Liberals; most of the seats that they did pick up were in Ontario, which was credited more to the popular provincial government of George A. Drew than Bracken's leadership of the national party. Bracken became Leader of the Opposition and remained leader of the Tories until he was pushed to resign in favour of Drew in 1948.

It has been argued, with some credibility, that Bracken never succeeded in impressing his personal authority over the national PC organization. As a western populist, he was distrusted by the party's eastern establishment. There are reports that some senior Tories wanted him removed as leader as early as 1944. More importantly, during the 1945 election, Bracken had promised conscription for the planned invasion of Japan. The Liberal Prime Minister, William Lyon Mackenzie King, by contrast had promised that one division of volunteers would take part in the invasion of Japan. Operation Downfall, the code-name for the invasion of Japan, was widely expected to be bloody campaign as the Battles of Iwo Jima and Okinawa were the "dress rehearsals" for the invasion of the Japanese home islands. Canadian public opinion was not keen on conscription for what was expected to be a campaign that would last several years.

Bracken's riding was merged into the seat of Brandon before the 1949 federal election. He was soundly defeated by Liberal incumbent James Matthews, and did not return to political life thereafter. Though his leadership of the Tories was generally viewed as a failure, he would gain some small degree of vindication in his later years as his western populist policies would be employed more successfully by John Diefenbaker, who succeeded Drew as leader in 1956, gaining the party a power base in the western provinces that would reliably support them from the late 1950s until their fall as a party of government in 1993.

Bracken died on March 18, 1969, and is buried in Rideauvale Cemetery at Kars, Ontario.

Electoral record
Federal

Archives 
There are John Bracken fonds at the Archives of Manitoba and Library and Archives Canada.

References

 Manitoba Historical Society profile

External links
 John Bracken at The Canadian Encyclopedia

1883 births
1969 deaths
Leaders of the Opposition (Canada)
Members of the House of Commons of Canada from Manitoba
Members of the King's Privy Council for Canada
Members of the United Church of Canada
Premiers of Manitoba
Progressive Conservative Party of Canada MPs
Academic staff of the University of Saskatchewan
Progressive Party of Manitoba MLAs
Ontario Agricultural College alumni
Curlers from Manitoba
Finance ministers of Manitoba
Members of the Executive Council of Manitoba
Progressive Conservative Party of Canada politicians